Juan Brandáriz Movilla (born 2 March 1999), commonly known as Chumi, is a Spanish professional footballer who plays as a central defender for Almería.

Club career

Barcelona
Born in A Laracha, A Coruña, Galicia, Chumi joined FC Barcelona's youth setup in 2014, from Deportivo La Coruña. In June 2018, after finishing his graduation, he was promoted to the reserves in Segunda División B.

Chumi made his senior debut on 1 September 2018, starting in a 0–1 home loss against SD Ejea. His maiden appearance for the first team came on 1 November, when he started in the 1–0 away victory over Cultural y Deportiva Leonesa for the Copa del Rey. 

On 8 November 2018, Chumi renewed his contract with Barça until 2020, with a €100 million release clause. On 30 June 2020, he left the club as his contract expired.

Almería
On 10 September 2020, free agent Chumi agreed to a two-year contract with UD Almería in Segunda División.

Career statistics

Honours

Club
Barcelona
UEFA Youth League: 2017–18

Spain U17
UEFA European Under-17 Championship runner-up: 2016

References

External links

1999 births
Living people
People from Bergantiños
Sportspeople from the Province of A Coruña
Spanish footballers
Footballers from Galicia (Spain)
Association football defenders
Segunda División B players
FC Barcelona Atlètic players
FC Barcelona players
UD Almería players
Spain youth international footballers